Dr. Bendapudi Venkata Satyanarayana (30 January 1927 – 15 August 2005) was an Indian dermatologist who was known as 'the doyen of dermatology' in Andhra Pradesh, India.

Publications
 Ratnam A.V, Brahmayya Sastry P, Satyanarayana B.V. : Ascorbic acid and melanogenesis, British Journal of Dermatology, 97 (2), 201–204, 2006.

References

Telugu people
Indian dermatologists
1927 births
2005 deaths
20th-century Indian medical doctors
Medical doctors from Andhra Pradesh
People from Eluru
All India Institute of Medical Sciences, New Delhi alumni
Andhra University alumni